Ferenc Kovács may refer to:
 Ferenc Kovács (footballer) (1934–2018), Hungarian footballer and coach
 Ferenc Kovács (politician, born 1953), Hungarian politician
 Ferenc Kovács (politician, born 1960), Hungarian jurist and politician
 Ferenc Kovács (table tennis), Hungarian table tennis international